Albert Lunn is a former professional rugby league footballer who played in the 1950s and 1960s. He played at club level for Castleford (Heritage No. 341), as a goal-kicking , i.e. number 1.

Playing career

Career records
Albert Lunn holds Castleford's "most goals in a career" record with 875, and Castleford's "most points in a career" record with 1,870.

Club career
Albert Lunn made his début for Castleford in the 12-2 victory over the Belle Vue Rangers on Saturday 20 October 1951.

References

External links
Search for "Lunn" at rugbyleagueproject.org
Albert Lunn Memory Box Search at archive.castigersheritage.com

Living people
Castleford Tigers players
English rugby league players
Place of birth missing (living people)
Rugby league fullbacks
Year of birth missing (living people)